Jamboard is a digital interactive whiteboard developed by Google to work with Google Workspace, formerly known as G Suite. It was officially announced on 25 October 2016. It has a 55" 4K touchscreen display and can be used for online collaboration using Google Workspace. The display can also be mounted onto a wall or be configured into a stand.

History 
After Google Apps for Work was launched in 2006, the subscription-based service was announced to be re-branded as G Suite on 29 September 2016, alongside announcements of machine learning integration into Drive's programs, a redesign of Hangouts and the announcement of Team Drive.

On 25 October, Product Manager of G Suite TJ Varghese announced Jamboard on Google's official blog. The announcement trailer for the product was released the same day onto YouTube. The website was also launched on the same day simultaneously, as well as a rumored version of an "Early Adopter Program" for the device. Jamboard was officially released in May 2017.

Hardware

Operating system 
Jamboard has an operating system that coincides with the Google Workspace ecosystem. Any service compatible with Google Workspace can also be performed on the device.

Online service 
Jamboard, more commonly known as Google Jamboard in this use case, is also available as a service to anyone with a Google account.

Once on the landing page, a user is able to create a 'Jam' where they are able to draw, create shapes, lines, and add text. The user can also choose between four pen types and six colors. There are also tools provided to erase and move objects, as well as create digital sticky notes, and turn their touchpoint into a digital laser pointer.

References 

Google
Google hardware
Products introduced in 2017